Paraglaciecola oceanifecundans is a bacterium from the genus of Paraglaciecola which has been isolated from the Southern Ocean.

References

External links
Type strain of Paraglaciecola oceanifecundans at BacDive -  the Bacterial Diversity Metadatabase

Bacteria described in 2014
Alteromonadales